Serpa is a surname. Notable people with the surname include:

Adhemar Serpa (1898–1978), Brazilian water polo player
Enrique Serpa (1899/1900-1968), Cuban writer, see Cuban literature
Horacio Serpa (born 1943), Colombian lawyer and politician
Innocentius Serpa (1573–1625), Italian Roman Catholic bishop
Ivan Serpa (1923–1973), Brazilian painter, draftsman, printmaker, designer and educator
Jorge Enrique Serpa Pérez (born 1942), Cuban Roman Catholic bishop
José Serpa (born 1979), Colombian road racing cyclist
Louise Serpa (1925–2012), American rodeo photographer
Marcello Serpa (born 1963), Brazilian advertising executive
Patricia Serpa (born 1948), American politician
Ronal W. Serpas (born ), American police chief
Vasco Serpa (born 1971), Portuguese sport sailer

See also
Serpas